Zev Garber is an American academic. He is Professor Emeritus and Chair of Jewish Studies at Los Angeles Valley College, and the editor of Shofar, a peer-reviewed academic journal of Jewish Studies. He is the former president of the National Association of Professors of Hebrew. He was the subject of a Festschrift in 2009.

Early life
Garber attended Bar-Ilan University in Israel, and he graduated with a bachelor of arts degree in Hebrew from Hunter College. He studied Hebrew, Aramaic, Syriac, Ugaritic at UCLA graduate school. He earned a master of arts degree and completed his course work for PhD in Religion at the University of Southern California.

Garber started his career as a Hebrew teacher at the Los Angeles Hebrew High School.

Garber joined the faculty at Los Angeles Valley College in 1970. Within a year, he established a Jewish Studies major. As of 2016, he is Professor Emeritus and Chair of Jewish Studies. He was the Visiting Rosenthal Professor of Judaic Studies at Case Western Reserve University in 2005. He taught Jewish studies at the University of California at Riverside and at the American Jewish University.
Garber has been the co-editor and later editor of Shofar since 1994. He served as the President of the National Association of Professors of Hebrew, where he still serves as an officer. He has been the editor of Iggeret, the newsletter of the NAPH, since 1984.

Garber established the first Jewish Studies program in a public school of higher learning in the State of California at Los Angeles Valley College (1971). He is recognized as a pioneer of Jewish Studies at two-year public colleges. His scholarship embraces Jewish Studies pedagogy, Shoah theology, Jewish Jesus, and interfaith dialogue. His (and Bruce Zuckerman) advocacy of Shoah not Holocaust as the term of record for the murder of European Jewry during WW II, presented at the Oxford Conference ("Remembering for the Future," 10–13 July 1988) was among the first to advocate careful terminology to describe the Jewish genocide.

Garber, published author and presenter of hundreds of academic articles and reviews, was the subject of a Festschrift edited by Steven L. Jacobs entitled Maven in Blue Jeans: A Festschrift in Honor of Zev Garber in 2009.

Garber, Zev, Hakak, Lev, Katz, Shmuel, eds., (2017). The Maskil in Our Time:Studies in Honor of Moshe Pelli.Israel: Hakibutz Hameuchad Publishing House. . Hebrew and English.
Garber, Zev and Hanson, Kenneth, Judaism and Jesus (2020), Cambridge Scholars Publishing, Newcastle upon Tyne, UK 
Garber, Zev and Hanson, Kenneth, "The Annotated Passover Haggadah" (2021), GCRR Press, Denver, CO
Garber, Zev and Hanson, Kenneth,"Teaching the Shoah:Mandate and Momentum" (2023), Cambridge Scholars Publishing, Newcastle upon Tyre, UK

References

Living people
1941 births
Bar-Ilan University alumni
Critics of the Christ myth theory
Hunter College alumni
University of Southern California alumni
Los Angeles Valley College people
American Hebraists
Academic journal editors